Ebergassing is a municipality in the district of Bruck an der Leitha in the Austrian state of Lower Austria. It formerly belonged to Wien-Umgebung District which was dissolved at the end of 2016.

Population

References

Cities and towns in Bruck an der Leitha District